Radostyán is a village in Borsod-Abaúj-Zemplén County in northeastern Hungary.

Etymology
The name comes from Slavic/Slovak  Hradišťany: "the people who belong to the castle" (hradište)  → Radostyán.

References

Populated places in Borsod-Abaúj-Zemplén County